The Vermilion Range is a mountain range of the Canadian Rockies, in Banff National Park, Canada. The range is east of the Sawback Range and west of the Bare and Palliser Ranges. 

This range includes the following mountains and peaks:



Geology
The mountains in Banff Park are composed of sedimentary rock laid down during the Precambrian to Jurassic periods. Formed in shallow seas, this sedimentary rock was pushed east and over the top of younger rock during the Laramide orogeny.

Climate
Based on the Köppen climate classification, the range experiences a subarctic climate with cold, snowy winters, and mild summers. Temperatures in winter can drop below  with wind chill factors below .

References

See also
 Geography of Alberta

Mountain ranges of Alberta
Ranges of the Canadian Rockies